Underground is an album by guitarist Phil Keaggy, released in 1983, on Nissi Records. It is a collection of demo tracks recorded by Keaggy in his home studio.

The album was re-released in 2000 on CD by the Phil Keaggy Club, and features a different track order.

Track listing
All songs written by Phil Keaggy.

1983 LP and cassette release
Side one
 "What a Love" — 3:56
 "The Ransom" — 3:47
 "Deadline" — 3:36
 "Think About It" — 3:36
 "One in a Million" — 4:36
 "I Know Someone" — 3:41
 "A Glorious Sunset" (cassette only)

Side two
 "The Two of You" — 4:56
 "Paid in Full" — 4:20
 "What You Are Inside" — 3:35
 "Follow Me On" — 3:24
 "The Survivor" — 5:12
 "When I Say I Love You" (cassette only)

2000 CD re-release
 "Paid in Full" — 4:20
 "I Know Someone" — 3:48
 "Deadline" — 3:33
 "What a Love" — 3:45
 "The Two of You" — 5:01
 "One in a Million" — 4:33
 "The Ransom" — 3:50
 "What You Are Inside" — 3:35
 "A Glorious Sunset" — 4:02
 "Follow Me On" — 3:22
 "Think About It" — 3:46
 "When I Say I Love You" — 3:11
 "The Survivor" — 5:16

Personnel
Phil Keaggy: guitars, drum programming, percussion, bass, keyboards, vocals
Bernadette Keaggy: partial lead vocal on "Think About It"

Production notes
Produced, recorded and mixed by Phil Keaggy.
Songs written and recorded: autumn 1982-spring 1983.

References

1983 albums
Phil Keaggy albums
Demo albums